Witmer may refer to:

 Witmer, Pennsylvania, a census-designated place
 Witmer Lake, a lake in Indiana

People with the given name
 Witmer Stone (1866–1939), American ornithologist, botanist, and mammalogist

People with the surname
 Charles B. Witmer (1862–1925), U.S. federal judge
 Denison Witmer, American songwriter
 Elizabeth Witmer (born 1946), Canadian politician
 Jill Witmer (born 1991), American field hockey player
 John Witmer (1951–2004), Canadian musician
 Lawrence Witmer (born 1959), American paleontologist and paleobiologist
 Lightner Witmer (1867–1956), American psychologist
 Tamara Witmer (born 1984), American model and actor

See also
 Witmer v. United States, a 1955 Supreme Court case
 Whitmer (disambiguation)
 Wittmar, Lower Saxony, Germany
 Wittmer, a surname